"Pink Elephants on Parade" is a song and scene from the 1941 Disney animated feature film Dumbo in which Dumbo and Timothy Q. Mouse, having accidentally become intoxicated (through drinking water spiked with champagne), see pink elephants sing, dance, and play musical instruments during a hallucination sequence. After the sequence, Dumbo and Timothy wake up, hungover, in a tree. It is at this point that they realize that Dumbo can fly.

The song was written by Oliver Wallace (music) and Ned Washington (lyrics) and sung by The Sportsmen. The segment was directed by Norman Ferguson, laid out by Ken O'Connor and animated by Hicks Lokey, Karl Van Leuven, and Howard Swift.

The song is featured in the Disney live-action remake, directed by Tim Burton. The Pink Elephants themselves appear as human-made bubble sculptures which also come to life.

In popular culture

Covers 
 The song was covered by Sun Ra. A recording of this arrangement is available on Stay Awake, a tribute album of Disney tunes played by various artists, and produced by Hal Willner. The song was also covered by Circus Contraption and Lee Press-on and the Nails.
 Daladubz samples the song in his dubstep song entitled "Pink Elephants VIP".
 The song was re-recorded by Chicago-based electronic/industrial rock band V is for Villains.
 Disney's House of Mouse pays homage to the song in the episode "Mickey and Minnie's Big Vacation".

Parodies
 Scenes from this sequence are reused in the 1943 Disney World War II propaganda film Der Fuehrer's Face.
In The Big Snooze, Elmer Fudd's nightmare includes a parody of the sequence with "ziwwions and twiwwions of wabbits" marching on top of Fudd while Bugs Bunny is at an adding machine, literally multiplying them.
The Bob's Burgers episode "Art Crawl" parodies the sequence with animals marching backwards with pink circles on their anuses.
The Tiny Toon Adventures episode "Test Stress" includes a parody of the scene with a bunch of Albert Einsteins walking around and one of them uses an "E=mc" pump.
The South Park episode "Doubling Down" references this sequence in a brief segment in which Eric Cartman, while in a hallucinatory fit of rage, visualizes a group of pink Kyles marching out of a broken heart.
"Heffalumps and Woozles" from Winnie the Pooh and the Blustery Day and The Many Adventures of Winnie the Pooh bears a strong resemblance to "Pink Elephants on Parade".
The SpongeBob SquarePants episode "One Trick Sponge" features a short musical sequence with an instrumental and visuals bearing resemblance to "Pink Elephants on Parade".
The Simpsons episode "D'oh-in' in the Wind" features a cameo of Pinky the Elephant who Barney summons by drinking a Duff beer after ingesting tainted juice that causes a monster to appear in his home.

See also 
Frank Churchill

References

Dumbo
1941 songs
Disney songs
Songs about elephants
Songs with music by Oliver Wallace
Songs with lyrics by Ned Washington
Music published by Bourne Co. Music Publishers